The Somali languages form a group that are part of the Afro-Asiatic language family. They are spoken as a mother tongue by ethnic Somalis in Horn of Africa and the Somali diaspora. Even with linguistic differences, Somalis collectively view themselves as speaking dialects of a common language.

Some neighboring populations and individuals have also adopted the languages. Somali is for instance used as a second language by Girirra.

Overview
Somali variations form a group of East Cushtic languages that are part of the Afroasiatic language family.

Classification

Somali linguistic varieties are broadly divided into three main groups: Northern, Benadir and Maay. Northern Somali (or Nsom) forms the basis for Standard Somali.

The most extensive publication on the subject is Marcello Lamberti's 'Die Somali-Dialekte'. Both Lamberti (1986) and Blench (2006) separate Central and Benadir into two distinct groups, Digil and Maay and Benadir and Ashraaf, respectively:

Somali
Northern 
Benadir 
Ashraaf
Maay
Digil

Northern

Northern Somali is spoken by more than 60% of the entire Somali population. Its primary speech area stretches from Djibouti, Somaliland and to parts of the eastern and southwestern sections of Somalia. This widespread modern distribution is a result of a long series of southward population movements over the past ten centuries from the Gulf of Aden littoral. Northern Somali is subdivided into three dialects: Northern Somali proper (spoken in the northwest), the Darod group (spoken in the northeast and along the eastern Ethiopia frontier), and the Lower Juba group (spoken by northern Somali settlers in the southern riverine areas). Northern Somali has frequently been used by famous Somali poets as well as the political elite, and thus has the most prestige out of the Somali dialects. Due to being wide spread, it forms the basis for Standard Somali. Most of the classical Somali poetry is recited and composed in the Northern Somali dialect.

Lamberti divides Northern Somali into three subgroups:
Northern Somali proper: spoken in the countries of Djibouti and Somaliland (Awdal, Maroodi Jeex, Saaxil, Togdheer, Sanaag and Sool). The dialects belonging to this group are the Issa, Gadabuursi, Isaaq and the Darood, (Warsangeli and Dulbahante). The greatest number of speakers overall.
'Darod group: spoken in the regions of Bari, Nugal, Mudug, in the Somali Region  of Ethiopia and along the Ethiopian border in the regions of Galguduud, Bakool and Gedo. The dialects of this group are the North-Eastern dialects (Marehan,Warsangeli, Dulbahante, Majeerteen, and Ogaden).
Lower Juba group: spoken by the part of the Northern Somali population which have immigrated into the Lower Juba region in the last 100/150 years. As this territory was a Benaadir-speaking area before the arrival of the immigrants from the north, the Nsom of Lower Jubba presents many peculiarities typical for the Benaadir dialects and could be considered a Benaadirised Nsom.

Coastal
Coastal Somali (also grouped as Benadir and Ashraf) is spoken on the Benadir coast from Hobyo to south of Merca, including Mogadishu and in the hinterland.
Coastal:

Benadiri
Northern
Southern
Ashraaf
Shingani
Lower Shabbelle

Central
Central Somali (also grouped as Digil and Maay) is spoken in the inter-riverine regions of Somalia by the Digil and Mirifle clans, collectively known as the Rahanweyn Somalis. They are most often described as dialects Others regard them as being divergent from the latter as Spanish is to Portuguese. Of the Central variations, Jiddu is the most incomprehensible to Benadir and Northern speakers.

Central:
Digil 
Tunni
Garre
Dabarre
Maay
Northern
Bur Hakaba

Other
In addition, Kirk (1905) reports Yibir and Midgan, spoken by the Yibir and Madhiban, respectively. Blench (2006) says, "These lects, spoken respectively by magicians and hunters among the Somali are said to differ substantially in lexicon from standard Somali. Whether this differentiation is in the nature of a code or these represent distinct languages remains unknown."

Other groupings
Ehert & Ali (1984) classifications represents a sharp contrast to that of the rest. They classify these variation into three main groups in a more genealogically focused approach:
Soomaali
Bayso-Jiddu
Bayso
Jiddu
Soomaali II
Rendille
Garre-Aweer
Garre
Aweer
Juba
Tunni
Bardheere
Soomaali IV
Maay
Northern-Benadir

Jiiddu in this model is relocated as not even a Somali sensu lato variety in origin, but instead as a sibling of Bayso. In contrast, Garre shows quite close affinity to Aweer, a language spoken by the physically and culturally distinct Aweer people. Evidence suggests that the Aweer/Boni are remnants of the early hunter-gatherer inhabitants of Eastern Africa. According to linguistic, anthropological and other data, these groups later came under the influence and adopted the Afro-Asiatic languages of the Eastern and Southern Cushitic peoples who moved into the area.

Reconstruction
Proto-Somali has been reconstructed by Biber (1982).

References

Omo–Tana languages
Somali culture